WXRS (1590 kHz) is an AM radio station broadcasting a classic hits format. Licensed to Swainsboro, Georgia, United States, the station is currently owned by Radiojones, LLC and features programming from Premiere Networks and United Stations Radio Networks.

References

External links

XRS